The African Company of Merchants or Company of Merchants Trading to Africa was a British chartered company operating from 1752 to 1821 in the Gold Coast area of modern Ghana, engaged in the Atlantic slave trade.

Background
The company was established by the African Company Act 1750, and in 1752 replaced the Royal African Company which had been established in 1660. Unlike its predecessor, the African Company of Merchants was a regulated company, not a joint stock company: Clause IV of African Company Act 1750 stated:  "That it shall not be lawful for the Company, established by this Act, to trade to or from Africa in their corporate or joint Capacity, or to have any joint or transferable Stock, or to borrow, or take up, any Sum or Sums of Money, on their Common Seal".

The assets of the Royal African Company were transferred to the new company and consisted primarily of nine trading posts or factories: Fort William, Fort James, Fort Sekondi, Fort Winneba, Fort Apollonia, Fort Tantumquery, Fort Metal Cross, Fort Komenda and Cape Coast Castle, the last of which was the administrative centre. This coastal area was dominated by the indigenous Fante people.

African Committee
The company was managed by the African Committee, which was composed of nine committee members, three each from London, Liverpool and Bristol. The constitution stipulated that the committee should be elected annually from the general body of traders from these cities, who paid 40 shillings to be admitted to the company. According to the constitution, these committee members could only hold the post for three years. However, in 1772 a series of pamphlets were published claiming that the Committee members were not acting properly.

The company was funded by an annual grant approved by Parliament, which covered the costs of the London office and the forts. The committee had to report to the Exchequer, the Admiralty and, from 1782, the Secretary at War. John Shoolbred,(1740–1802), uncle of another John Shoolbred noted for his advocacy of vaccination, was secretary to the committee for several years.

The imperial government prohibited the African slave trade after 1807, although the company continued to operate for some years afterwards.  In keeping with the ethos of liberal reform, administrative authority over the African Company's territory was transferred to Governor Charles MacCarthy of Sierra Leone, Sierra Leone having been founded as a refuge colony for freed formerly enslaved peoples. (Governor McCarthy was subsequently killed in the First Anglo-Asante War.)  In 1817, the company signed a treaty of friendship recognising the Asante claims to sovereignty over large areas of the coast, including areas claimed by the Fante.  However, after it became public knowledge that the company had continued the slave trade within its privately held territory, the British government abolished the company in 1821.

See also
List of committee members of the African Company of Merchants
Ashanti–Akim–Akwapim War 
Thomas Edward Bowdich
List of members of the African Company of Merchants

References

British colonisation in Africa
Chartered companies
History of West Africa
Defunct companies of the United Kingdom
History of Ghana
Economic history of Great Britain
1752 establishments in England
British companies established in 1752
British companies disestablished in 1821
1821 disestablishments in England
18th century in Africa
19th century in Africa
Economy of Ghana
African Company of Merchants